Miloš Krško (born 23 October 1979 in Bojnice) is a Slovak football defender who plays for Baník Horná Nitra. He previously played for OFK Metacolor Ludanice.

Club career
Krško previously played for FC Dinamo Tbilisi, MŠK Žilina, ŠK Slovan Bratislava, 1. FC Brno in the Czech Gambrinus liga and FK AS Trenčín.

International career
Krško played for Slovakia at the 2000 Olympic Games in Sydney.

References

1979 births
Living people
Slovak footballers
Association football defenders
AS Trenčín players
MŠK Žilina players
ŠK Slovan Bratislava players
Czech First League players
FC Zbrojovka Brno players
FC Dinamo Tbilisi players
Slovak Super Liga players
Erovnuli Liga players
Slovakia under-21 international footballers
Olympic footballers of Slovakia
Footballers at the 2000 Summer Olympics
Expatriate footballers in Georgia (country)
Sportspeople from Bojnice